Ama is a census-designated place (CDP) in St. Charles Parish, Louisiana, United States. Ama is on the West Bank of the Mississippi River, just west of the Jefferson Parish line. The population was 1,290 at the 2020 census.

History
Ama was named in honor of Amazalie Perret, the postmaster's daughter.

Geography
Ama is located at  (29.942144, -90.303940).

Demographics

According to the 2000 United States census, there were 1,285 people residing in Ama. By 2020, its population increased to 1,290. At the 2019 American Community Survey, there were 79.8 males per 100 females and the median age among its population was 40.

From 2010 census estimates to the 2020 census non-Hispanic or Latino whites and Black or African Americans have remained the largest racial and ethnic groups in the CDP, although multiracial Americans were also prominent. In 2000, the Ama's racial and ethnic makeup was 64.9% White, 34.4% Black or African American, 0.16% American Indian and Alaska Native, 0.16% Asian, 0.16% from some other race, 0.23% from two or more races, and 1.01% Hispanic or Latino American of any race.

Economically, the median income for a household in the CDP was $57,794; the CDP's mean income for a household was $65,775, up from a median of $41,691 in 2000. Among its population, 9.5% were approximately at or below the poverty line; 1.9% of families were below the poverty line in 2019.

Education
St. Charles Parish Public School System operates public schools:
Hahnville High School in Boutte

Previously the Ama School served the community.

Notable people
 Dana "Pokey" Chatman, former LSU Head Women's Basketball Coach, Head Coach Of Russia's Spartak in Euroleague; Head Coach and General Manager of WNBA's Chicago Sky. Cousin to Dawan and LaRon Landry.
 Dawan Landry, former American Football player, named to the 2006 Pro Football Weekly/Professional Football Writers of America All-Rookie Team.  The older brother of LaRon Landry and cousin to "Pokey" Chatman.
 LaRon Landry, former American Football player, the sixth overall selection in the first round of the 2007 NFL Draft by Washington.  The younger brother of Dawan Landry and cousin to "Pokey" Chatman.
 Sabrina Le Beauf, actress, mostly known from The Cosby Show, as Sandra Huxtable.

References 

Census-designated places in Louisiana
Census-designated places in St. Charles Parish, Louisiana
Census-designated places in New Orleans metropolitan area
Louisiana populated places on the Mississippi River